The Free City of Krakow is a 1985 Post apocalyptic military tabletop role-playing game adventure for Twilight: 2000 published by Game Designers' Workshop (GDW).

Contents
The Free City of Krakow is the first adventure module for Twilight: 2000, in which the player characters encounter the survivors of an ambushed US Special Forces Team. The Free City of Krakow is a campaign setting book that describes the neutral city of Krakow and its important people and places, and includes maps, brief scenarios, and new rules for helicopters.

Publication history
The Free City of Krakow was written by William H. Keith, Jr., with art by Steve Venters and Liz Danforth, and published in 1985 as a 48-page book by Game Designers' Workshop.

Reception
Timothy Tow reviewed The Free City of Krakow in Space Gamer No. 76. Tow commented that "Overall, The Free City of Krakow is a very good module, up to the normal high GDW standards, but it will take some work from the referee to preplan the adventure (e.g., no NPC characteristics are given). If you want an excellent setting for a Twilight: 2000 campaign, then pick up a copy."

Chris Felton reviewed Free City of Krakow in Imagine magazine, stating that "if you are a GM who can run this sort of adventure well, this is an excellent module for a very good game system".

In a retrospective review of The Free City of Krakow in Black Gate, Patrick Kanouse said "The Free City of Krakow is a fantastic supplement that provides a GM tons of info, excellent guidance and hooks but never mandates a singular path. The sandbox remains, and now the GM has more toys to create interesting encounters and adventures based on what the players do."

Reviews
Game News #10 (Dec., 1985)
Different Worlds #46 (May/June, 1987)

References

Role-playing game supplements introduced in 1985
Science fiction role-playing game adventures
Twilight: 2000